Krishna Bose (26 December 1930 – 22 February 2020) was an Indian politician, educator, author and social worker. She was a Member of Parliament elected from the Jadavpur constituency in West Bengal as an All India Trinamool Congress candidate.

She taught at City College, Kolkata for 40 years, and thereafter remained its principal for 8 years.

Early life and background
Bose was born on 26 December 1930 in Dacca to Charu C. Chaudhuri and Chhaya Devi Chaudhurani. Her father specialised in constitutional studies and was one of the secretaries of the West Bengal Legislative Assembly. She married Sisir Kumar Bose, on 9 December 1955 and has two sons, Sumantra Bose, Sugata Bose and a daughter Sarmila Bose. Sisir Bose is the son of Sarat Chandra Bose, the elder brother of Subhas Chandra Bose. He too fought against the British Raj and was imprisoned in Lahore Fort and Red Fort for his role in Subhas Chandra Bose's escape from Calcutta in 1941 during the Quit India Movement and World War II.

Bose has a B.A. (Hons.) and an M.A. in English Literature from Calcutta University, Calcutta, West Bengal and the prestigious degree of Sangeet-Visharad from Bhatkhande Music Institute, Lucknow, Uttar Pradesh.

Career
Krishna taught for 40 years at the City College, Kolkata, where she was Head of the Department of English and served as the Principal of the college for eight years.

She was first elected as a member of Parliament to the 11th Lok Sabha during the 1996–1998 term from Jadavpur as a member of Congress. She was also a member of Parliament in 12th, (1998–1999) and 13th (1999–2004) Lok Sabhas. During her 3rd term, she served as:
 Chairperson, Committee on External Affairs
 Member, General Purposes Committee
 Member, Joint Committee on Patents (Second Amendment) Bill, 1999
 Member, Committee on Official Language

Interests and accomplishments
Bose was actively involved in public work. She was the president of the Trust of the Institute of Child Health, Calcutta and chaired the Council of the Netaji Research Bureau, the president of Vivek Chetana – a non-profit organisation for disadvantaged women and children and a member of the international P.E.N.
Krishna was a columnist for journals in English and Bengali such as Desh, Anandabazar Patrika, Jugantor, Amrit Bazar Patrika, The Statesman, Telegraph, Illustrated Weekly of India. She also worked in the areas of women and child development and for the welfare of the handicapped.

Death
Bose died on 22 February 2020 in a hospital off EM Bypass in Kolkata at the age of 89. She was suffering from age-related ailments and had a second stroke few days before.

References

External links 
 

1930 births
2020 deaths
India MPs 1999–2004
Women in West Bengal politics
Trinamool Congress politicians from West Bengal
University of Calcutta alumni
Academic staff of the University of Calcutta
Educators from West Bengal
India MPs 1996–1997
India MPs 1998–1999
Lok Sabha members from West Bengal
Articles created or expanded during Women's History Month (India) - 2014
Academic staff of City College, Kolkata
20th-century Indian women politicians
20th-century Indian politicians
21st-century Indian women politicians
21st-century Indian politicians
20th-century Indian educators
21st-century Indian educators
Women educators from West Bengal
People from South 24 Parganas district
20th-century women educators
21st-century women educators